Quercus austrocochinchinensis is an uncommon species of tree in the beech family Fagaceae. It has been found in Vietnam and Thailand as well as Yunnan Province in southern China. It is placed in subgenus Cerris, section Cyclobalanopsis.

Quercus austrocochinchinensis is a tree up to 15 m. tall, with brown twigs and leaves as much as 200 mm long.  The acorn is oblate, 11-14 × 13-18 mm, angular, yellowish-brown tomentose, with rounded apex; the scar is approx. 12 mm in diameter.

References

External links
line drawing, Flora of China Illustrations vol 4, figure 391, drawings 5 + 6 at lower right

austrocochinchinensis
Flora of Yunnan
Trees of Indo-China
Trees of China
Plants described in 1921
Taxa named by Aimée Antoinette Camus